Marko Vukasinovic (born ) is a Montenegrin male volleyball player. He is part of the Montenegro men's national volleyball team. On club level he plays for Nafels.

References

External links
 profile at FIVB.org

1993 births
Living people
Montenegrin men's volleyball players
Place of birth missing (living people)